Tang Talkh-e Do (also known as Tang Talkh) is a village in Abolfares Rural District, in the Central District of Ramhormoz County, Khuzestan Province, Iran. At the 2006 census, its population was 124, in 25 families.

References 

Populated places in Ramhormoz County